Lerkils IF is a Swedish football club located in Vallda.

Background
Lerkils IF currently plays in Division 4 Halland which is the sixth tier of Swedish football. They play their home matches at the Ledets IP in Vallda.

The club is affiliated to Hallands Fotbollförbund.  In 2008 season the club played Reading F.C. in a friendly match, losing by 1–0. Lerkils IF have competed in the Svenska Cupen on 6 occasions and have played 12 matches in the competition.

Season to season

Footnotes

External links
 Lerkils IF – Official website
 Lerkils IF on Facebook

Football clubs in Halland County